The Medal "For the Defence of Leningrad" was a World War II campaign medal of the Soviet Union established on December 22, 1942 by decree of the Presidium of the Supreme Soviet of the USSR to recognise the valour and hard work of the Soviet civilian and military defenders of Leningrad during the 872-day siege of the city by the German armed forces between September 8, 1941 and January 27, 1944.  The medal's statute was later amended by Resolution of the Presidium of the Supreme Soviet on March 8, 1945.  and again one last time on July 18, 1980 by decree of the Presidium of the Supreme Soviet of the USSR № 2523-X.

Medal statute 
The Medal "For the Defence of Leningrad" was awarded to all participants in the defence of Leningrad - soldiers of the Red Army, Navy and troops of the NKVD, and also to the persons from the civilian population who took part in the defence of Leningrad during its siege by German forces.  

The Resolution of the Presidium of the Supreme Soviet of March 8, 1945 granted the petition of Yaroslavl regional organizations to award the medal "For the Defence of Leningrad" to the most distinguished participants in the construction of defensive structures in the Leningrad area by the civilian population of the Yaroslavl region.

Award of the medal was made on behalf of the Presidium of the Supreme Soviet of the USSR on the basis of documents attesting to actual participation in the defence of Leningrad issued by the unit commander, the chief of the military medical establishment or by a relevant provincial or municipal authority.  Serving military personnel received the medal from their unit commander, retirees from military service received the medal from a regional, municipal or district military commissioner in the recipient's community, members of the civilian population, participants in the defence of Leningrad received their medal from regional or city Councils of People's Deputies.  The medal came with by an award certificate.  

The Medal "For the Defence of Leningrad" was worn on the left side of the chest and in the presence of other awards of the USSR, was located immediately after the Medal "For Distinction in Guarding the State Border of the USSR".  If worn in the presence or Orders or medals of the Russian Federation, the latter have precedence.

Medal description 
The Medal "For the Defence of Leningrad" was a 32mm in diameter circular brass medal with a raised rim.  At the forefront in the lower half of the obverse, the relief images of a helmeted Red Army soldier (nearest), a sailor (middle) and a worker (farthest), all three with rifles at the ready.  In the background of the entire obverse, the relief outline of the Leningrad Admiralty building.  Along the upper circumference of the medal, the relief inscription in prominent letters "FOR DEFENCE OF LENINGRAD".  On the reverse near the top, the relief image of the hammer and sickle, below the image, the relief inscription in three rows "FOR OUR SOVIET MOTHERLAND".  

The Medal "For the Defence of Leningrad" was secured by a ring through the medal suspension loop to a standard Soviet pentagonal mount covered by a 24mm wide olive green silk moiré ribbon with a 2mm central green stripe.

Recipients (partial list)
The individuals below were recipients of the Medal "For the Defence of Leningrad".

Politician in charge of the defence of Leningrad Andrei Alexandrovich Zhdanov
Poet and wartime Leningrad radio broadcaster Olga Fyodorovna Bergholz
Seriously wounded at Leningrad painter Sergei Ivanovich Osipov
Marshal of the Soviet Union Kliment Yefremovich Voroshilov
Marshal of the Soviet Union Georgy Konstantinovich Zhukov
People's Artist of the USSR Galina Pavlovna Vishnevskaya
Marshal of the Soviet Union Leonid Aleksandrovich Govorov
Marshal of the Soviet Union Kirill Afanasievich Meretskov
Marshal of the Soviet Union Sergey Fyodorovich Akhromeyev
Rear Admiral Vladimir Konstantinovich Konovalov
People's Artist of the USSR Yuri Vladimirovich Nikulin
Stage actor and director Yuri Petrovich Lyubimov
Admiral Vladimir Filippovich Tributs
Admiral Gordey Ivanovich Levchenko
Lieutenant General Alexey Alexandrovich Kuznetsov
Army General Ivan Ivanovich Fedyuninsky
Admiral of the Fleet Hovhannes Stepani Isakov
Admiral Vladimir Vasilyevich Mikhailin
Ace tanker Lieutenant Colonel Zinoviy G. Kolobanov
Captain 1st grade Ivan Vasilyevich Travkin
Honoured Artist of Russian Federation Nikolai Efimovich Timkov
Leningrad native and veteran Piotr Konstantinovich Vasiliev
Veteran artilleryman Rostislav Ivanovich Vovkushevsky
Veteran artilleryman People's Artist of the Russian Federation Ivan Mikhailovich Varichev
Champion figure skater Maya Petrovna Belenkaya
Marshal of the Soviet Union Petr Kirillovich Koshevoi
Lieutenant General Nikolai Pavlovich Simoniak
Scientist and engineer Mikhail Borisovich Golant
Painter Nikolai Nikolaevich Brandt
Physicist Yuri Andreevich Yappa

See also 
Awards and decorations of the Soviet Union
Saint Petersburg
Hero City
Siege of Leningrad

References

External links 
 Legal Library of the USSR

Soviet campaign medals
Military awards and decorations of the Soviet Union
1942 establishments in the Soviet Union
Awards established in 1942